Old Train is the fourth album by the progressive bluegrass band The Seldom Scene. The album offers the group in their original lineup and features their trademark songs "Wait a Minute", "Old Train" and "C & O Canal". The record is a mixture of progressive,  traditional bluegrass and folk material and also features guest musicians as Ricky Skaggs on violin or Linda Ronstadt on vocals.
.

Track listing
 "Appalachian Rain" (Paul Craft) – 2:38
 "Wait a Minute" (Herb Pedersen) – 3:31
 "Different Roads" (John Starling) – 2:31
 "Old Train" (Herb Pedersen, Nikki Pedersen) – 2:15
 "Through the Bottom of the Glass" (Paul Craft) – 2:22
 "Old Crossroads" (Traditional) – 3:08
 "Pan American" (Williams) – 2:40
 "Working on a Building" (Traditional) – 3:33
 "Walk Through This World With Me" (Kaye Savage, Sandra Seamons) – 2:02
 "Maybe You Will Change Your Mind" (Don Reno) – 2:32
 "Traveling On and On" (Traditional) – 2:43
 "C & O Canal" (John Starling) – 2:35

Personnel
The Seldom Scene
 John Starling - vocals, guitar
 John Duffey - mandolin, vocals
 Ben Eldridge - banjo, guitar, vocals
 Mike Auldridge - Dobro, guitar, vocals
 Tom Gray - bass, vocals

with
 Ricky Skaggs - fiddle, viola
 Bob Williams - harmonica
 Paul Craft - guitar
 Linda Ronstadt - vocals

Artwork
The cover art depicts a steam locomotive, with number 5303 clearly visible.  Locomotive 5303 was a Baltimore and Ohio Railroad class P Locomotive (4-6-2) named President Madison, built in 1927 and retired in 1957.

References

External links
Official site

1974 albums
The Seldom Scene albums
Rebel Records albums